Twinkle may refer to:

 Twinkling, the variation of brightness of distant objects

People
 Twinkle (singer) (1948–2015), born Lynn Annette Ripley, English singer-songwriter
 Twinkle Khanna, Indian movie actress
 Twinkle Bajpai, female contestant in the reality show Sa Re Ga Ma Pa Challenge 2005

Science and technology
 Twinkle (software), Qt-based VoIP soft phone for Linux
 TWINKLE, a hypothetical integer factorization device
 Twinkle (protein), a protein coded by a gene also called TWNK, C10orf2 or PEO1

Entertainment
 Twinkle (comic), a British comic book, published 1968–1999
 Twinkle (book), by Katharine Holabird
 Twinkle, a character in the video game Puzzle Bobble 3 (a.k.a. Bust-a-Move 99)
 Twinkle, a fictional character in Higglytown Heroes
 Twinkle, one of the cousins from We Love Katamari and Me & My Katamari
 Twinkle, a character in Diana Wynne Jones's novel House of Many Ways
 Twinkle, a recurring fictional character in the British sitcom dinnerladies 
 Twinkle, a sword carried by R. A. Salvatore's character Drizzt Do'Urden
 Twinkles, a cartoon elephant appearing in episodes of King Leonardo and His Short Subjects

Music
 Twinkle (EP), EP by Girls' Generation subunit TaeTiSeo, and the title song
 "Twinkle", a pop song by Kumi Koda and Show Luo
 "Twinkle", a 1981 single by Earl Klugh 
 "Twinkle", a 1996 single by Whipping Boy (Irish band)
 "Twinkle Song", a song on Miley Cyrus & Her Dead Petz

Other
 Twinkles, an Occupy movement hand signal

See also
 Twinkle Stars, a manga
 Twinkle Star Sprites, a video game
 Twinkleshine, a My Little Pony
 Twinkle, Twinkle, Little Star, popular English lullaby